The 1996 Heineken Cup Final was the final match of the 1995–96 Heineken Cup, the inaugural season of Europe's top club rugby union competition. The match was played on 6 January 1996 at the Arms Park in Cardiff. The match was contested by Cardiff of Wales and Toulouse of France. Toulouse won the match 21–18 after extra time; they took the lead with two tries in the first 10 minutes, but the kicking of Adrian Davies kept Cardiff level. With the scores at 15–12 as the clock ticked past 80 minutes, Davies stepped up again and slotted over a penalty to take the game to extra time. Christophe Deylaud restored Toulouse's lead with another penalty shortly after the game restarted, before Davies tied the scores up again. Then, going into the final few seconds of extra time, the referee penalised Cardiff for using hands in the ruck; Deylaud slotted the resulting penalty to seal Toulouse's victory.

Match details

See also
1995–96 Heineken Cup

References

Final
1996
Hein
Heineken Cup Final 1996
Hein
1990s in Cardiff
Stade Toulousain matches